Archeological Site No. 143-16 is a historic camp site that is part of the Penobscot Headwater Lakes Prehistoric Sites. It is located in Ripogenus, Maine and was added to the National Register of Historic Places on October 31, 1995.

References

		
National Register of Historic Places in Piscataquis County, Maine